Roger Jean-Baptiste Robert Wets (born February 1937) is a "pioneer" in stochastic programming and a leader in variational analysis who publishes as Roger J-B Wets. His research, expositions, graduate students, and his collaboration with R. Tyrrell Rockafellar have had a profound influence on optimization theory, computations, and applications. Since 2009, Wets has been a distinguished research professor at the mathematics department of the University of California, Davis.

Schooling and positions
Roger Wets attended high school in Belgium, after which he worked for his family while earning his Licence in applied economics from Université de Bruxelles (Brussels, Belgium) in 1961. He was encouraged by Jacques H. Drèze to study optimization with George Dantzig at the program in operations research at the University of California, Berkeley. Dantzig and mathematician–statistician David Blackwell jointly supervised Wets's dissertation. In 1965 Wets befriended R. Tyrrell Rockafellar, whom Wets introduced to stochastic optimization, starting a collaboration of many decades.

He worked at Boeing Scientific Research Labs, 1964–1970 and was Ford Professor at the University of Chicago, 1970–1972 before being appointed Professor at the Mathematics Department of the University of Kentucky and then University Research Professor (1977–78). While at the International Institute for Applied Systems Analysis (IIASA) in Austria, during 1980–1984, he led research in decision-making in uncertainty, returning as an acting leader in 1985–1987; during that time, Wets and Rockafellar developed the progressive-hedging algorithm for stochastic programming. The University of California, Davis named him Professor (1984–1997), Distinguished Professor, and Distinguished Research Professor of Mathematics (2009–).

Awards and contributions

Wets was awarded a George B. Dantzig Prize for "original research that has had a major impact on the field of mathematical programming" by the Society for Industrial and Applied Mathematics (SIAM) and the Mathematical Programming Society (MPS, now the Mathematical Optimization Society). In 1994, the Dantzig Prize was awarded to Wets and also to the French pioneer in nonsmooth computational-optimization, Claude Lemaréchal.

Wets's contributions included developing set-valued analysis, including metric spaces of sets, which he used to study the convergence of epigraphs; Wets's ideas of epigraphical convergence was used to study the convergence iterative methods of stochastic optimization and has had applications in the approximation theory of statistics. A metric theory of finite-dimensional epigraphical convergence ("cosmic convergence") appears in Variational analysis. Wets and his coauthor R. Tyrrell Rockafellar were awarded the 1997 Frederick W. Lanchester Prize by the Institute for Operations Research and the Management Sciences (INFORMS) for their monograph Variational Analysis, which was published in November 1997 and copyrighted in 1998.

With Rockafellar, Wets proposed, studied, and implemented the progressive-hedging algorithm for stochastic programming. Besides his theoretical and computational contributions, Wets has worked with applications on lake ecology (IIASA), finance (Frank Russel investment system), and developmental economics (World Bank). He also consulted with the development of professional stochastic-optimization software (IBM).

See also
 Pompeiu–Hausdorff distance

References

Sources

External links
 Homepage of Roger J-B Wets at the Mathematics Department of the University of California, Davis. Contains biography, research overviews, lectures and presentations.

Variational analysts
Mathematical analysts
20th-century Belgian mathematicians
21st-century American  mathematicians
Belgian operations researchers
American statisticians
Belgian statisticians
Living people
1937 births
Place of birth missing (living people)
American operations researchers